Erzin may refer to:

Erzin, Turkey, a city in Turkey
Erzin, Russia, a rural locality (a selo) in the Tuva Republic, Russia
Erzin River, a river in Mongolia

See also
 Erzincan
 Erzinsky District